The 2009 San Bernardino mayoral election was held on November 3, 2009, to elect the mayor of San Bernardino, California. It saw the reelection of incumbent mayor Pat Morris.

A candidate won out right pass 50% No runoff was needed.

Results

References 

San Bernardino
Mayoral elections in San Bernardino, California
San Bernardino